Shamsur Rahman Khan Shahjahan (died 2 January 2012) was a Bangladesh Awami League politician and the former Jatiya Sangsad member from Tangail-3 constituency.

Career
Shahjahan fought in the Bangladesh Liberation war in Tangail district as a member of the Mukti Bahini. He was elected to parliament from Tangail-3. He was the President of Tangail district unit of Bangladesh Awami League.

Death
Shahjahan died on 2 January 2012. His nephew Amanur Rahman Khan Rana & brother Ataur Rahman Khan elected to parliament from his constituency.

References

1930s births
2012 deaths
Awami League politicians
Mukti Bahini personnel
1st Jatiya Sangsad members
3rd Jatiya Sangsad members
Year of birth missing
Place of birth missing
20th-century Bengalis
21st-century Bengalis
Bangladesh Krishak Sramik Awami League central committee members
People from Tangail District